The North Macedonia women's national basketball team represents North Macedonia in international women's basketball competitions.They played their first match in 1999 B -Division for Womens Eurobasket. The National team played 3 times in B-Division Womens Eurobasket .

Competitions
Until 1992 Macedonia was part of the  Yugoslavia women's national basketball team.After 1992 the national team didn't menage to qualify for the final stage of the competitions. 
 B-Division or Promotion Cup now called FIBA Women's European Championship for Small Countries was held in Ohrid Biljanini Izvori Sports Hall twice.First in 2000 European Promotion Cup for Women the national team was the host of the event.They won tournament by winning for victories against Gibraltar 129:12 ,Malta 83-20,Andora 102:35 and Scotland 68:41.

2012 FIBA Women's European Championship for Small Countries After 12 years was held for the second time in Ohrid , and this time they've finished second.The host of the tournament was again Ohrid Sports Center.This time the score was 4-1 after losing the final game.At Biljanini Izvori Sports Hall they won against Gibraltar 83:36,Austria 41:39, Wales 106:48 in the group stage.In the semi-final they've beat Scotland 80:61.In the final game they faced Austria again ,this time losing the close game by 63:68.

After few seasons they entered the Womens Eurobasket qualification . They played 3 times in the Womens Eurobasket Qualification.

Olympic Games
  1980 (3) , 1984 (6), 1988 (2)

World Championship

  1959 (4), 1964 (6), 1967 (6), 1983 (8), 1990 (2)

EuroBasket

  1954(5),1956(9),1958(4),1960(5),1962(5),1964(7)
 1966(6),1968(2),1970(3),1972(8),1974(8),1976(5),1978(2)
 1980(3),1981(4),1983(4),1985(5),1987(2),1989(4),1991(2)

Mediterranean Games

Team
Aleksandra Stojanovska
Tijana Mitreva
Matea Nikolikj
Nena Trajchevska
Merit Hempe
Elena Antikj capetan
Ilina Selcova
Milica Nikolikj
Devana Boner
Angela Mitrishanovikj
Ivana Kmetovska
 Menager:Aleksandar Ashadanov

Home ground
 
The BTSC – Boris Trajkovski Sports Center ,  Skopje is a multi-functional indoor sports arena. It is located in the Karpoš Municipality of Skopje, Macedonia. It is named after the former president, Boris Trajkovski. Its capacity is 10,000 .There is an Olympic size Swimming Pool and 5 Star Hotel Alexander Palace within the complex. Additional Water Land Fun Park and Ice Skating Rink next to it.

The arena is a home-ground of the  Macedonian basketball team (men and women). The venue also contains four restaurants and a sports bar.

External links
Basketball Federation Of Macedonia (Official Website)

Women's national basketball teams
B
 
national